Secrets at Sea is a 2011 children's novel written by Newbery medalist Richard Peck and illustrated by award-winning artist Kelly Murphy. It is a tale of a family of mice stowaways on an adventurous ship's journey, set in the late 19th century.

Plot
The Story of the four mice and their journey on a ship.

Chapters:

Chapter 1 – Great changes

Chapter 2 – Skitter and Jitter

Chapter 3 – The Haystack

Chapter 4 – When Night and Darkness Fell

Chapter 5 – Two Futures

Chapter 6 – A World of Steam and Humans

Chapter 7 – Dinner is Served

Chapter 8 – The Law of the Sea

Chapter 9 – A Royal Command

Chapter 10 – Camilla's Train

Chapter 11 – Sebastian's Secret Sweet Shop

Chapter 12 – Secrets the Dark Night Keeps

Chapter 13 – Dynasty and Destiny

Chapter 14 – Waltz Time

Chapter 15 – A Fond Toodle-oo

Chapter 16 – A Palace Wedding

Characters
 Helena – The protagonist character, is the oldest mouse.
 Lamont
 Camilla
 Olive
 Duchess of Cheddar Gorge
 Nigel
 Mrs. Flora
 Mr. Floyd
 Lord Sebastian Sandown
 Mr. and Mrs. Cranston
 Mother and Father
 Katinka Van Tassel Dutch
 Vicky
 Alice
 Mrs. Flint
 Mona
 Mrs. Minture
 Gideon McSorley
 Barn
 Aunt Fannie Fanimore
 Elena
 Cecil
 Queen Victoria
 Lord Peter
 Lady Augusta Drear
 Nanny Pratt
 Little Lord Sandown
 The Mouse Queen

Reception
Secrets at Sea has received widespread acclaim and was featured on best books of the year lists by the New York Times, Kirkus Reviews and People Magazine. Additionally, the artwork for Secrets at Sea received Gold Medals from the Society of Illustrators of Los Angeles, as well as distinction from the Society of Illustrators in New York.

Awards

Best of lists
2011 Notable Children's Books, The New York Times
2011 Best Books for Children, Kirkus Reviews
2011 Ten Best Books for Children, People Magazine

Starred reviews
2011 Starred Review, Publishers Weekly
2011 Starred Review, The Horn Book
2011 Starred Review, Kirkus Reviews

Illustration competitions
2012 Original Art Show, Society of Illustrators
2013 Gold Medal (Children's Market Category), Society of Illustrators of Los Angeles

References

External links 

 

2011 American novels
American children's novels
American young adult novels

Children's historical novels
Children's novels about animals
Fictional mice and rats
2011 children's books
Dial Press books